Cory Hall (born December 5, 1976) is an American football coach and former player. He is currently the head coach at Edison High School in Fresno, California. He was drafted by the Cincinnati Bengals in the third round of the 1999 NFL Draft. He played college football at Fresno State. Hall also played for the Atlanta Falcons. In 2017, Hall served as Oregon State's interim head football coach for six games after Gary Andersen abruptly resigned.

Coaching career
Hall was the head coach at Clovis North High School for three seasons, from 2011 to 2013. While coaching at CNEC, he led the Broncos to a 32–8 record, a CIF Central Valley Championship in both Division I and Division II football, and secured second place in the Central Section in 2012. In a turn of events, Hall left Clovis North High School to pursue a coaching career at the collegiate level.
 Hall served as a graduate assistant under Beavers coach Gary Andersen at Wisconsin in 2014 before spending 2015 as secondary coach at Weber State. Hall was then named cornerbacks coach at Oregon State in 2016.

On October 9, 2017, Hall was named the interim head coach of Oregon State after the university and Gary Andersen decided to mutually part ways. Although Hall won the support of fans and the locker room, the Beavers struggled. Following two close losses to Colorado, 36-33, and No. 20 Stanford, 15-14, the Beavers were blown out in their final four games. Hall departed Oregon State following the season to become defensive backs coach at Central Michigan University under John Bonamego. Central Michigan fired Bonamego following the 2018 season and hired Jim McElwain to replace him; Hall originally decided to stay before resigning in February 2019.

Hall returned to the high school coaching ranks in 2020 when he became the head coach at Edison High School in Fresno, California.

Head coaching record

College

Notes

References

External links
 Central Michigan profile
 Oregon State profile

1976 births
Living people
American football safeties
Atlanta Falcons players
Central Michigan Chippewas football coaches
Cincinnati Bengals players
Fresno State Bulldogs football players
Oregon State Beavers football coaches
Weber State Wildcats football coaches
Wisconsin Badgers football coaches
High school football coaches in California
African-American coaches of American football
African-American players of American football
21st-century African-American sportspeople
20th-century African-American sportspeople